Amersham Museum at 49 High Street is a small local museum based in Amersham, Buckinghamshire, England. It is located on the High Street in Old Amersham.

The museum is located in a 15th-century half-timbered house, listed Grade II on the National Heritage List for England, with a herb garden to the rear, and covers local history. It has collections of fossils and archaeological finds, including objects from Roman and mediaeval times, and displays on local crafts including chairmaking, lace making and straw plait. It originally opened to the public in 1991. In 1993 the museum won a National Heritage Award, in 2001 it was extended at the front of the museum, and in 2005 it employed its first professional curator. During the period April to the end of September, the museum is open from 2pm to 4.30pm on Wednesdays, Thursdays, Saturdays and Sundays plus Bank Holiday Mondays. Normal admission is £2.50 for adults, £1 for 5-15 year-olds with under 5s entering free.

Position:

See also 
 List of museums in Buckinghamshire
 St Mary's Church, also in Old Amersham

References

External links 
 
 Amersham Museum wiki

Houses completed in the 15th century
1991 establishments in England
Museums established in 1991

Amersham
Herb gardens
Historic house museums in Buckinghamshire
Local museums in Buckinghamshire
Museums with wikis
Grade II listed houses in Buckinghamshire